Christopher Eric Lane (born November 9, 1984) is an American country music singer and songwriter. He has released one album as frontman of the Chris Lane Band, a second album, Girl Problems, and a third album, Laps Around the Sun. via Big Loud Records. Lane has charted seven singles on Hot Country Songs and Country Airplay, three of which went to No.1 ("Fix", "I Don't Know About You", and "Big, Big Plans").

Early life and career beginnings
Lane grew up in Kernersville, North Carolina and has a twin brother named Cory. While attending Glenn High School, he and his brother played football and baseball, and both went on to play baseball in college at University of North Carolina at Charlotte. Lane learned to play the guitar when sports injuries affected his chances of a professional baseball career.  In his hometown he worked for his father's landscaping business and started a cover band that played in High Point University cafeteria. In 2007, Lane and his brother auditioned for the seventh season of American Idol  but did not make it to Hollywood. It wasn't until 2008 when Chris’s high school friend Brent Eliason introduced  him to Seth England of Big Loud Mountain and told his 'Uncle Seth' he had to listen to his mixtape. This was the moment which launched Chris's career as an up-and-coming country music artist.

Career
Before pursuing a solo career, Lane fronted the Chris Lane Band. Their album Let's Ride charted on the Billboard Top Country Albums chart in 2012. He moved to Nashville in 2013. Lane has opened for The Band Perry, Eli Young Band, Lee Brice, Chris Young and Brantley Gilbert, among others. In 2014, he opened for Florida Georgia Line on their This Is How We Roll Tour.

Lane's debut single, "Broken Windshield View", was released to country radio on June 10, 2014 by Big Loud Mountain. The song was written by Rodney Clawson, Shane Minor, and David Lee Murphy and produced by Joey Moi. It was featured on Sirius XM's The Highway and iTunes' New and Noteworthy. It sold 11,000 downloads in its first week of release and reached number 45 on the Billboard Hot Country Songs chart. As of August 2014, it has sold 43,000 downloads. It was also included on an extended play.

Lane released his debut album Girl Problems in August 2016. It accounted for the singles "Fix" and "For Her". His second album, Laps Around the Sun, produced the duet "Take Back Home Girl" featuring Tori Kelly. In 2021, he featured on the single "Tailgate to Heaven" by Canadian country artist Shawn Austin.

Personal life
In 2018, Lane began dating Lauren Bushnell, the winner of the 20th season of The Bachelor. They got engaged on June 16, 2019. The two married in Nashville on October 25, 2019. On December 6, 2020, Lane and Bushnell announced they were expecting their first child. On January 1, 2021, it was revealed expected baby to be a son. On June 8, 2021, their son was born. On June 6, 2022, Lane and Bushnell announced that were expecting their second child for late October. In October 2022, their second son was born.

Discography

Albums

Extended plays

Singles

Featured singles

Music videos

Awards and nominations

References

External links 

1984 births
21st-century American singers
American country singer-songwriters
American male singer-songwriters
American Idol participants
Country musicians from North Carolina
Living people
People from Kernersville, North Carolina
American twins
Big Loud artists
21st-century American male singers
Singer-songwriters from North Carolina